Newby and Scalby is a civil parish in the Scarborough district of North Yorkshire, England, formed by the smaller southern area of Newby and the larger, northern, area of Scalby.

Geography

The shape of the parish is a rectangle perpendicular to the coast, omitting the south-east corner which is the sea life centre and park of Scarborough, with a north-west rectangular projection most of which is closer to Burniston than Scalby.  The village forms one large cluster in the mid-south of this area traversed by several small roads and passing through is a section of the relatively minor A171.  Newby is south of the Scalby Beck (or Sea Cut) and is physically undivided from the rest of Scarborough.  The coast here is cliffs topped by the Cleveland Way including Scalby Ness.

Demography
According to the 2011 UK census, Newby and Scalby parish had a population of 9,513.  At the time of the last census the rate of home ownership (with or without a loan) was greater than the average in the district and the proportion of social housing was significantly lower in terms of housing stock. The population here had decreased by 2.4% from the 2001 UK census figure of 9,748.

Amenities
Scalby has the high street of the two settlements, commercial at street-level leading westward and upwards into the North York Moors National Park.

Scarborough RUFC, play and train immediately north of the built-up area.  A separate ground in Scarborough itself is the ground of Scarborough Pirates ARLFC.

Scalby Cricket Club and Scalby Football Club share a ground on Carr Lane.

The 13th-century parish church to St Laurence in Scalby  was modified to include a tower since 1683 and is a grade II* listed building, the middle category of listing.

Newby and Scalby Primary School is the main amenity named after both villages or suburbs. Scalby School is local secondary school in the parish.

References

External links

Civil parishes in North Yorkshire